Per Gunnar Andersson (born 21 August 1954) is a former Swedish biathlete. He competed in the 10 km sprint event at the 1980 Winter Olympics.

References

External links
 

1954 births
Living people
Swedish male biathletes
Olympic biathletes of Sweden
Biathletes at the 1980 Winter Olympics
People from Ljusdal Municipality
20th-century Swedish people